Scotch Hall is a historic plantation house located near Merry Hill, Bertie County, North Carolina. It was built about 1838, and is a large -story, five bay by four bay, frame dwelling in a transitional Federal / Greek Revival style.

It was added to the National Register of Historic Places in 1982.

George H. Throop lived at Scotch Hall for a time in 1849 and served as tutor to the children of the family who lived there. His experiences were the basis for two novels, Nag's Head and Bertie, in which Scotch Hall is depicted as the plantation "Cypress Shore".

References

Plantation houses in North Carolina
Houses on the National Register of Historic Places in North Carolina
Greek Revival houses in North Carolina
Federal architecture in North Carolina
Houses completed in 1838
Houses in Bertie County, North Carolina
National Register of Historic Places in Bertie County, North Carolina